William Joseph Hanlon (June 24, 1876 in Los Angeles, California – November 23, 1905 in Los Angeles, California), was a former professional baseball player who was a in the Major Leagues in 1903.

External links

1876 births
1905 deaths
Major League Baseball infielders
Chicago Cubs players
Saint Mary's Gaels baseball players
San Jose (minor league baseball) players
San Jose Brewers players
Santa Clara Broncos baseball players
Sacramento Gilt Edges players
Sacramento Senators players
Los Angeles (minor league baseball) players
Seattle Siwashes players
Tacoma Tigers players
Olympia Senators players